In mathematics and physics, the Magnus expansion, named after Wilhelm Magnus (1907–1990), provides an exponential representation of the solution of a first-order homogeneous linear differential equation for a linear operator. In particular, it furnishes the fundamental matrix of a system of linear ordinary differential equations of order  with varying coefficients. The exponent is aggregated as an infinite series, whose terms involve multiple integrals and nested commutators.

The deterministic case

Magnus approach and its interpretation 

Given the  coefficient matrix , one wishes to solve the initial-value problem associated with the linear ordinary differential equation

 

for the unknown -dimensional vector function .

When n = 1, the solution simply reads 
 

This is still valid for n > 1 if the matrix  satisfies  for any pair of values of t, t1 and t2. In the general case, however, the expression above is no longer the solution of the problem.

The approach introduced by Magnus to solve the matrix initial-value problem is to express the solution by means of the exponential of a certain  matrix function  
:
 
which is subsequently constructed as a series expansion:
 

 
to solve for  recursively in terms of  "in a continuous analog of the CBH expansion", as outlined in a subsequent section.

The equation above constitutes the Magnus expansion, or Magnus series, for the solution of matrix linear initial-value problem. The first four terms of this series read
 
where  is the matrix commutator of A and B.

These equations may be interpreted as follows:  coincides exactly with the exponent in the scalar ( = 1) case, but this equation cannot give the whole solution. If one insists in having an exponential representation (Lie group), the exponent needs to be corrected. The rest of the Magnus series provides that correction systematically:  or parts of it are in the Lie algebra of the Lie group on the solution.

In applications, one can rarely sum exactly the Magnus series, and one has to truncate it to get approximate solutions. The main advantage of the Magnus proposal is that the truncated series very often shares important qualitative properties with the exact solution, at variance with other conventional perturbation theories. For instance, in classical mechanics the symplectic character of the time evolution is preserved at every order of approximation. Similarly, the unitary character of the time evolution operator in quantum mechanics is also preserved (in contrast, e.g., to the Dyson series solving the same problem).

Convergence of the expansion 

From a mathematical point of view, the convergence problem is the following: given a certain matrix , when can the exponent   be obtained as the sum of the Magnus series?

 
where  denotes a matrix norm. This result is generic in the sense that one may construct specific matrices  for which the series diverges for any .

Magnus generator 

A recursive procedure to generate all the terms in the Magnus expansion utilizes the matrices  defined recursively through
 
 
which then furnish
 
 

Here adkΩ is a shorthand for an iterated commutator (see adjoint endomorphism):
 

Finally, when this recursion is worked out explicitly, it is possible to express  as a linear combination of n-fold integrals of n − 1 nested commutators involving  matrices :
 

The stochastic case

Extension to stochastic ordinary differential equations 
For the extension to the stochastic case let  be a -dimensional Brownian motion, on the probability space 
with finite time horizon  and natural filtration. Now, consider the linear matrix-valued stochastic Itô differential equation (with Einstein's summation convention over the index )
 

Convergence of the expansion 
In the stochastic setting the convergence will now be subject to a stopping time  and a first convergence result is given by:

Under the previous assumption on the coefficients there exists a strong solution , as well as a strictly positive
stopping time  such that:
  has a real logarithm  up to time , i.e.
 
 the following representation holds -almost surely:
 
where  is the -th term in the stochastic Magnus expansion as defined below in the subsection Magnus expansion formula;

Magnus expansion formula 
The general expansion formula for the stochastic Magnus expansion is given by:
 
where the general term  is an Itô-process of the form: 
 

The terms  are defined recursively as
 
with
 
and with the operators  being defined as

Applications 

Since the 1960s, the Magnus expansion has been successfully applied as a perturbative tool in numerous areas of physics and chemistry, from atomic and molecular physics to nuclear magnetic resonance and quantum electrodynamics.  It has been also used since 1998 as a tool to construct practical algorithms for the numerical integration of matrix linear differential equations. As they inherit from the Magnus expansion the
preservation of qualitative traits of the problem, the corresponding schemes are prototypical examples of geometric numerical integrators.

See also 

 Baker–Campbell–Hausdorff formula
 Derivative of the exponential map

Notes

References 

 
 
 
 
 

Ordinary differential equations
Stochastic differential equations
Lie algebras
Mathematical physics